Zambezi District is a district of Zambia, located in North-Western Province. The capital lies at Zambezi. As of the 2000 Zambian Census, the district had a population of 64,963 people. It consists of two constituencies, namely Zambezi West and Zambezi East.

References

Districts of North-Western Province, Zambia